Mount Ophir is a ghost town in Mariposa County, California. It was a mining town founded in 1850 during the California Gold Rush, and was the site of the Mount Ophir Mint, the first authorized mint in California.

History
Mount Ophir during the early 1850s was a large camp, and stores and tents straggled along the main road for quite a distance. In 1854, Louis Trabucco purchased the stone-walled trading post in Mount Ophir, which was patronized by miners and packers. Its ruins now stand next to the foundation of a large two-store frame hotel built in 1852. The Post Office opened in 1852 under the name "Ophir" but was changed in 1856 to "Mount Ophir" because of the name conflict with Ophir in Placer County.

Mount Ophir Mint
The gold stamping mill was built in 1850-51 by Moffat and Company, operating under the authority of Augustus Humbert, who had been appointed by President John Tyler to be the federal assayer for the new state of California.  The Mount Ophir Mint produced Octagonal Gold Slugs with a fifty-dollar denomination.

On February 14, 1851 the newspaper, the San Francisco Prices Current, indicated that the production of $50 slugs was about to begin: 
The above cut represents the obverse of the United States ingot, or, rather, coin, of the value of $50, about to be issued at the Government Assay Office. It is precisely of this size and shape.... The reverse side bears an impression of rayed work without any inscription. Upon the edges following: 'Augustus Humbert United States Assayer-California Gold 1851.'... The fifty-dollar pieces will be of uniform value, and will be manufactured in the same manner as coins.... By order of the secretary of the Treasury these ingots and coin are to be received for duties and other dues to the United States government, and our bankers, we are advised, will receive them at their stamped value. This will produce an important change in the monetary affairs here, gold dust will immediately go up, … 

Much of the coinage produced by the Mount Ophir Mint was later melted down into government ingots. By 1853 the mint was closed. The ruins of the mill are still visible.

See also

References
 Cottin, Charles M. (1949) Moffatt & Co's Mount Ophir Mint Hewitt Bros., Chicago, OCLC 58879187
 Kagin, Donald H. (1981) Private Gold Coins and Patterns of the United States Arno Publications, New York,

Notes

External links
 "Mount Ophir: California Ghosttown"
 "The California Gold Country: Highway 49 Revisited: Mount Ophir"
 "California's First Mint- Myth or Mystery?"

Former settlements in Mariposa County, California
Mining communities of the California Gold Rush
Ghost towns in California
History of Mariposa County, California
Mints of the United States
Populated places established in 1850
1850 establishments in California